Earl of Lincoln is a title that has been created eight times in the Peerage of England, most recently in 1572. The title was borne by the Dukes of Newcastle-under-Lyne from 1768 to 1988, until the dukedom became extinct.

Earls of Lincoln, first creation (1141)
William d'Aubigny, 1st Earl of Lincoln and 1st Earl of Arundel ( 1109–1176)

The Earldom was created for the first time probably around 1141 as William d'Aubigny, 1st Earl of Arundel, is mentioned as Earl of Lincoln in 1143 in two charters for the Abbey of Affligem, representing his wife Adeliza of Louvain, former wife of King Henry I.

Earls of Lincoln, second creation (after 1143)
William de Roumare, Earl of Lincoln (1096–1155) (reverted to Crown)

The Earldom was created for the second time by King Stephen sometime after 1143 for William de Roumare. However, in 1149 or 1150, as William had gone over to the side of Empress Matilda, King Stephen took the earldom from him and elevated Gilbert de Gant as Earl of Lincoln.

Earls of Lincoln, third creation (about 1149)
Gilbert de Gant, Earl of Lincoln (1120–1156) (reverted to crown)

The Earldom was created for the third time by King Stephen in 1149 or 1150 for Gilbert de Gant, but on his death in 1156 it reverted to the Crown.

Earls of Lincoln, fourth creation (1217)
The Earldom was created for the fourth time in 1217 during the reign of Henry III (1207-1272) for Ranulph de Blondeville. He had no issue. In April 1231, with the consent of the King, before his death, he passed the Earldom to his sister Hawise of Chester, and she was formally invested by King Henry III in October 1232. Royal consent was needed for this because the Earldom would otherwise have reverted to the crown in the absence of a legitimate male heir. She in turn passed the Earldom, again with the consent of the King, jointly to her daughter Margaret de Quincy (d.1266), who thereby became suo jure 2nd Countess of Lincoln, and to the latter's husband (Hawise's son-in-law) John de Lacy (c. 1192-1240) 8th Baron of Halton, 8th Hereditary Constable of Chester and feudal baron of Pontefract. They were formally invested by Henry III in November 1232. There is doubt as to whether their son Edmund de Lacy (1230-1258) became Earl of Lincoln, as he predeceased his mother, but not his father. The Complete Peerage gives him as the 3rd Earl, but notes that "he does not appear to have been formally invested with the earldom, presumably because his mother outlived him". Edmund's son Henry de Lacy, 4th Earl of Lincoln,  married Margaret Longespée. Their daughter Alice de Lacy, 5th Countess inherited the earldom and married Thomas, 2nd Earl of Lancaster. She had no children and thus on Alice's death in 1348 the earldom became extinct.
 1217–1231 Ranulf de Blondeville, 1st Earl of Lincoln (1172–1232)
 1231–1232 Hawise of Chester, suo jure 1st Countess of Lincoln (1180–c. 1242) (received as inter vivos gift April 1231)
 1232–1266 Margaret de Quincy, suo jure 2nd Countess of Lincoln ( 1206–1266)  (received 23 Nov 1232 as inter vivos gift from her mother Hawise of Chester)
 1232–1240 John de Lacy, 2nd Earl of Lincoln (1192–1240) (held jointly with his wife)
Edmund de Lacy, Baron of Pontefract (1230-1258), son, never "formally invested with the earldom, presumably because his mother outlived him".
 1272–1311 Henry de Lacy, 4th Earl of Lincoln (1251–1311), son, during whose wardship the earldom was administered by his mother Alice of Saluzzo from 1266–1272.
 1311–1348 Alice de Lacy, suo jure 5th Countess of Lincoln  (1281–1348), on whose death without issue the title became extinct.

The above list does not contain the men who became Earl of Lincoln by right of their wives who were Countess of Lincoln suo jure, except for John de Lacy, 2nd Earl of Lincoln. He is included in the above list because he was created Earl of Lincoln by Royal Charter (together with his wife Margaret de Quincy, Countess of Lincoln). The other men who became Earl of Lincoln by right of their wives were:
 Walter Marshal, 5th Earl of Pembroke, married Margaret de Quincy in January 1242, died November 1245
 Thomas of Lancaster, husband of Alice de Lacy, became Earl of Lincoln on the death of his father-in-law in February 1311, died March 1322
 Sir Eubulus le Strange, married Alice de Lacy before November 1324, died September 1335
 Hugh de Freyne, married Alice de Lacy before March 1336, died  January 1337

As Earl of Lincoln, these husbands had immense power with the right to control the estates of their wives.

The above list also does not include Margaret Longespée, who was Countess of Salisbury in her own right, but Countess of Lincoln only by right of her husband Henry de Lacy, 3rd Earl of Lincoln.

Earls of Lincoln, fifth creation (1349)
 Henry of Grosmont (–1361), Earl of Lincoln (1349–1361)

The Earldom was created for the fifth time in the following year, 1349, when it was revived for Alice's nephew-in-law Henry of Grosmont, who was later created Duke of Lancaster. It became extinct on his death in 1361.

Earls of Lincoln, sixth creation (1467)
John de la Pole, Earl of Lincoln (1462–1487)

The Earldom was created for the sixth time in 1467 for John de la Pole. He was the eldest son of John de la Pole, 2nd Duke of Suffolk, and Elizabeth of York. He predeceased his father and the title became extinct on his death in 1487.

Earls of Lincoln, seventh creation (1525)
Henry Brandon, Earl of Lincoln (1523–1534)

The Earldom was created for the seventh time in 1525 for Henry Brandon. He was the second son of Charles Brandon, 1st Duke of Suffolk, by his wife Mary Tudor. He died at the age of eleven in 1534 when the title became extinct.

Earls of Lincoln, eighth creation (1572)
This creation of the Earldom was made for the eighth time in 1572 for the naval commander Edward Clinton, 9th Baron Clinton (see Baron Clinton for earlier history of the family). He served as Lord High Admiral under Edward VI, Mary I and Elizabeth I. He was succeeded by his son, the second Earl. He represented Launceston and Lancashire in the House of Commons. His son, the third Earl, sat as Member of Parliament for Great Grimsby and Lincolnshire. In 1610 he was summoned to the House of Lords through a writ of acceleration in his father's junior title of Baron Clinton.

His great-grandson, the fifth Earl, died without surviving issue in 1692 thus the earldom and barony separated. The barony fell into abeyance between his aunts (see Baron Clinton for further history of this title). He was succeeded in the earldom by his second cousin once removed, the sixth Earl. He was the grandson of Sir Edward Clinton, the second son of the second Earl. His son, the seventh Earl, served as Paymaster of the Forces, as Constable of the Tower and as Cofferer of the Household. Lord Lincoln married Lucy Sydney (died 1736), daughter of Robert Sydney, 2nd Earl of Leicester (see the Earl of Chichester for earlier history of the Pelham family).

His eldest son, the eighth Earl, died as a child and was succeeded by his younger brother, the ninth Earl. He was Cofferer of the Household and Lord Lieutenant of Nottinghamshire and Cambridgeshire. He married his first cousin Catherine Pelham (died 1760), daughter and heiress of Henry Pelham. In 1756 his uncle the Duke of Newcastle upon Tyne was created Duke of Newcastle-under-Lyne, with remainder to his nephew Lord Lincoln, and on the Duke's death in 1768 Lincoln succeeded as second Duke of Newcastle-under-Lyne according to the special remainder. He assumed by Royal Licence the additional surname of Pelham the same year.

The Duke's two elder sons, George Pelham-Clinton, Lord Clinton, and Henry Pelham-Clinton, Earl of Lincoln, both predeceased him. He was therefore succeeded by his third son, the third Duke, who was a Major-General in the Army. On his early death, the titles passed to his son, the fourth Duke. He served as Lord Lieutenant of Nottinghamshire from 1809 to 1839. He was succeeded by his son, the fifth Duke, a prominent politician who held office as Chief Secretary for Ireland, as Secretary of State for the Colonies and as Secretary of State for War. His eldest son, the sixth Duke, briefly represented Newark in the House of Commons; he married Henrietta Adele, the wealthy heiress and daughter of Henry Thomas Hope.

He was succeeded by his eldest son, the seventh Duke, who died childless and was succeeded by his younger brother.  In 1881 the eighth Duke assumed by Royal Licence the additional surname of Hope on inheriting the substantial Hope estates through his paternal grandmother. On his death, the titles passed to his only son, the ninth Duke. He had two daughters but no sons and was succeeded by his third cousin, the tenth Duke. He was the great-grandson of Lord Charles Pelham-Clinton, second son of the fourth Duke. He died unmarried in December 1988, having held the titles for only a month. On his death the dukedom became extinct, while he was succeeded in the earldom by his distant relative, the eighteenth Earl, a descendant in the tenth generation of the Hon. Sir Henry Fynes-Clinton, third son of the second Earl. Lord Lincoln lived all his life in Australia, and reportedly learned of his succession from a British newspaper.  He wrote a book: Memoirs of an Embryo Earl.  the title is held by his grandson, the nineteenth Earl, whose father had died in 1999. He is a Fellow of the Zoological Society of London, and still lives in Australia.

Several other members of the Clinton family have also gained distinction. Edward Clinton, Lord Clinton, son of the fourth Earl, was Member of Parliament for Callington. The Honourable George Clinton, youngest son of the sixth Earl, was a naval Commander, politician and Colonial administrator. His son General Sir Henry Clinton was Commander-in-Chief of the British in North America from 1778 to 1782. His sons General Sir William Henry Clinton and Lieutenant-General Sir Henry Clinton were also successful military commanders. Lord Edward Pelham-Clinton GCVO, second son of the fifth Duke, was a soldier and courtier.

The seat of the Dukes of Newcastle was Clumber House near Worksop, Nottinghamshire. However, the house was demolished in 1938. The surrounding estate was sold to the National Trust in 1946 and is now a country park featuring a walled kitchen garden, open to the public.

An extensive collection of papers of the Pelham-Clinton Dukes of Newcastle-under-Lyne has been deposited at the department of Manuscripts and Special Collections, The University of Nottingham.

Edward Clinton, 1st Earl of Lincoln (1512–1585)
Henry Clinton, 2nd Earl of Lincoln (1539–1616)
Thomas Clinton, 3rd Earl of Lincoln (1568–1619)
Theophilus Clinton, 4th Earl of Lincoln (1600–1667)
Edward Clinton, 5th Earl of Lincoln (1645–1692)
Francis Clinton, 6th Earl of Lincoln (1635–1693)
Henry Clinton, 7th Earl of Lincoln (1684–1728)
George Clinton, 8th Earl of Lincoln (1718–1730)
Henry Fiennes Pelham-Clinton, 2nd Duke of Newcastle-under-Lyne, 9th Earl of Lincoln (1720–1794), succeeded as 2nd Duke of Newcastle-under-Lyne in 1768
Thomas Pelham-Clinton, 3rd Duke of Newcastle, 10th Earl of Lincoln (1752–1795)
Henry Pelham Fiennes Pelham-Clinton, 4th Duke of Newcastle, 11th Earl of Lincoln (1785–1851)
Henry Pelham Pelham-Clinton, 5th Duke of Newcastle, 12th Earl of Lincoln (1811–1864)
Henry Pelham Alexander Pelham-Clinton, 6th Duke of Newcastle, 13th Earl of Lincoln (1834–1879)
Henry Pelham Archibald Douglas Pelham-Clinton, 7th Duke of Newcastle, 14th Earl of Lincoln (1864–1928)
Henry Francis Hope Pelham-Clinton-Hope, 8th Duke of Newcastle, 15th Earl of Lincoln (1866–1941)
Henry Edward Hugh Pelham-Clinton-Hope, 9th Duke of Newcastle, 16th Earl of Lincoln (1907–1988)
Edward Charles Pelham-Clinton, 10th Duke of Newcastle, 17th Earl of Lincoln (1920–1988) – unmarried, with no heirs, the dukedom became extinct; however the Earldom of Lincoln was inherited by a distant cousin in Australia
Edward Horace Fiennes-Clinton, 18th Earl of Lincoln (1913–2001); 10th cousin of the 10th Duke and 17th Earl
Robert Edward Fiennes-Clinton, 19th Earl of Lincoln (born 19 June 1972)

Present peer
Robert Edward Fiennes-Clinton, 19th Earl of Lincoln (born 19 June 1972) is the son of Hon. Edward Gordon Fiennes-Clinton and his wife Julia Eleanor Howson. He is a Fellow of the Zoological Society of London. On 7 July 2001 he succeeded his grandfather as Earl of Lincoln (E., 1572). In 2003 he was living at Warnbro, Western Australia. By 2008 he was reported to be living in Perth and in 2019 in Parmelia.

The heir presumptive is his younger brother the Hon. William Roy Howson (born 1980), who in 1996 assumed by Government Licence the surname of Howson in lieu of Fiennes-Clinton. His heir apparent is his son Jordan Ryder Howson (born 2004).

Family tree

See also
Duke of Lancaster
Duke of Suffolk
Duke of Newcastle
Earl of Chichester
Baron Clinton
Henry Pelham

References

External links
 Biographies of the Dukes of Newcastle-under-Lyne and their predecessors, with links to online catalogues, from Manuscripts and Special Collections at The University of Nottingham

 
Lincoln
Earldoms in the Peerage of England
Extinct earldoms in the Peerage of England
Earl of
Noble titles created in 1141
Noble titles created in 1217
Noble titles created in 1349
Noble titles created in 1467
Noble titles created in 1525
Noble titles created in 1572